Jablanica is a settlement southeast of Ilirska Bistrica in the Inner Carniola region of Slovenia.

Mass graves
Jablanica is the site of three known mass graves or unmarked graves from the end of the Second World War. They all contain the remains of German soldiers from the 97th Corps that were killed at the beginning of May 1945. The Yard Grave is located in a meadow near two spruce trees at the house at Jablanica no. 26 and contains the remains of one soldier.

Church
The small church in the settlement is dedicated to Our Lady of the Snows and belongs to the Parish of Ilirska Bistrica.

References

External links
Jablanica on Geopedia

Populated places in the Municipality of Ilirska Bistrica